The German Ski Association ( or DSV) is the national governing body for skiing in Germany. The organisation was founded in 1905 among local ski clubs. The German Ski Association represents international interests of the German skiing and trains athletes and trainers. The DSV headquarters are located in Planegg, south of Munich. Current DSV president is Franz Steinle.

Divisions
The DSV represents these sports:

 Competitive sport:
 Alpine skiing
 Biathlon
 Cross-country skiing
 Freestyle skiing
 Nordic combined
 Skicross
 Ski jumping
 Telemark skiing
 Popular sport:
 Nordic Walking
 Ski Inline
 Tourenwesen

External links
 Official website

Germany
Skiing
Skiing organizations
Skiing in Germany
Sports organizations established in 1905
1905 establishments in Germany